Maurizio Fondriest (born 15 January 1965) is a retired Italian professional road racing cyclist.

Career
Born in Cles, Trentino, Fondriest turned professional in 1987 with the Ecoflam team. He subsequently rode for Alfa-Lum in 1988, winning the World Cycling Championships along with stages in the Tour de Suisse and Tirreno–Adriatico. In 1991, riding for Panasonic, he won the UCI Road World Cup.

In 1993, riding for the Lampre team, he won Milan–San Remo, La Flèche Wallonne, the Züri-Metzgete, the Giro dell'Emilia, the general classification and two stages of Tirreno–Adriatico, three stages and the general classification of the Grand Prix du Midi Libre, a stage in the Giro d'Italia and the overall World Cup. He never again had such a successful season, although he had another successful season with Lampre in 1995: in that year he won a stage in the Giro d'Italia and came in second in a number of races (the Tirreno–Adriatico general classification, Milan–San Remo, Gent–Wevelgem, La Flèche Wallonne, and a stage in the Giro d'Italia).

Retirement
He retired in 1998 after riding for Cofidis for two years, and founded a bicycle manufacturer, called Fondriest, which makes carbon fiber bicycles.

Major results

1985
1st Piccolo Giro di Lombardia
1st Stage 8 Giro Ciclistico d'Italia
1986
1st GP di Poggiana
1st Circuito Belvedere
1987
1st Stage 4 Volta a Catalunya
3rd Paris–Tours
3rd Coppa Bernocchi
3rd Giro di Romagna
3rd Memorial Gastone Nencini
6th Giro dell'Emilia
6th Milano–Torino
7th Coppa Placci
8th GP Industria & Artigianato di Larciano
1988
1st  Road race, UCI Road World Championships
1st GP Industria & Commercio di Prato
1st Stage 4 Tour de Suisse
1st Stage 1a Cronostaffetta
2nd Milan–San Remo
2nd Coppa Bernocchi
2nd Giro dell'Emilia
3rd Road race, National Road Championships
3rd Giro di Campania
3rd Coppa Placci
3rd Giro di Romagna
6th Overall Tirreno–Adriatico
1st Stage 4
6th Overall Tour of Belgium
6th Firenze–Pistoia
8th G.P. Camaiore
1989
1st Giro di Toscana
1st Coppa Sabatini
1st Stage 1a Cronostaffetta
2nd Wincanton Classic
2nd Giro del Friuli
2nd G.P. Camaiore
2nd Giro del Veneto
2nd Giro dell'Emilia
2nd Trofeo Baracchi
3rd GP Industria & Artigianato di Larciano
3rd Firenze–Pistoia
6th Giro di Romagna
10th Overall Tirreno–Adriatico
10th Züri-Metzgete
1990
1st Coppa Ugo Agostoni
1st Giro del Lazio
1st Stage 2 Settimana Internazionale di Coppi e Bartali
3rd Overall Tour of Britain
1st Stage 6
3rd Paris–Tours
5th Milan–San Remo
5th Tour of Flanders
5th Overall Tirreno–Adriatico
9th Road race, UCI Road World Championships
9th Milano–Torino
1991
1st  UCI Road World Cup
Volta a Catalunya
1st Stages 3a & 3b
1st Stage 3 Settimana Internazionale di Coppi e Bartali
2nd Amstel Gold Race
2nd Grand Prix Pino Cerami
3rd Clásica de San Sebastián
3rd Brabantse Pijl
4th Züri-Metzgete
4th Grand Prix des Nations
4th Firenze–Pistoia
5th Wincanton Classic
7th GP des Amériques
1992
1st Trofeo Melinda
1st Stage 5b Volta a Catalunya
1st Stage 3 Vuelta a Andalucía
2nd Giro del Lazio
3rd Road race, National Road Championships
3rd Giro di Campania
3rd Grand Prix Pino Cerami
4th Tour of Flanders
7th GP des Amériques
7th Milano–Torino
9th Paris–Tours
9th Coppa Placci
1993
1st  UCI Road World Cup
1st Milan–San Remo
1st La Flèche Wallonne
1st Züri-Metzgete
1st Giro dell'Emilia
1st Firenze–Pistoia
1st Challenge San Silvestro d'Oro
1st Challenge Giglio d'Oro
1st Baden-Baden
1st  Overall Tirreno–Adriatico
1st Stages 2 & 4
1st  Overall Giro del Trentino
1st Stages 2, 3 & 4
1st  Overall GP du Midi-Libre
1st Stages 2, 3 & 5
1st  Overall Escalada a Montjuïch
1st Stages 1a & 1b (ITT)
1st Stage 5 Vuelta a Andalucía
1st Stage 5 Settimana Internazionale di Coppi e Bartali
2nd Overall Volta a Catalunya
1st Prologue & Stage 6 (ITT)
2nd Paris–Tours
3rd Liège–Bastogne–Liège
3rd Wincanton Classic
3rd Millemetri del Corso di Mestre
4th Amstel Gold Race
5th Road race, UCI Road World Championships
7th Grand Prix des Nations
8th Overall Giro d'Italia
1st Stage 1b (ITT)
8th Tour of Flanders
1994
1st  Overall Tour de Pologne
1st Stages 2 & 6
1st  Overall Tour of Britain
1st Stages 1 & 3a (ITT)
1st Stage 3 Settimana Internazionale di Coppi e Bartali
1st Giro del Lazio
1st Coppa Sabatini
2nd Giro dell'Emilia
3rd Züri-Metzgete
3rd Firenze–Pistoia
5th Giro di Lombardia
7th Milano–Torino
1995
1st Stage 7 Giro d'Italia
1st Prologue Volta a Catalunya
2nd Gent–Wevelgem
2nd La Flèche Wallonne
2nd Giro di Romagna
2nd Overall Tirreno–Adriatico
3rd Overall Vuelta a Murcia
5th G.P. Camaiore
7th Rund um den Henninger Turm
8th Overall KBC Driedaagse van De Panne-Koksijde
1st Stage 3b (ITT)
8th Wincanton Classic
9th Time trial, UCI Road World Championships
9th Züri-Metzgete
1996
1st Stage 3b KBC Driedaagse van De Panne-Koksijde (ITT)
2nd Overall Tour de Pologne
1st Stage 8
3rd La Flèche Wallonne
3rd Overall Settimana Internazionale di Coppi e Bartali
3rd Overall Giro di Sardegna
4th Time trial, Olympic Games
7th Rund um den Henninger Turm
9th Züri-Metzgete
1997
1st Stage 2 Volta a la Comunitat Valenciana
4th Overall Tour du Limousin
6th Trofeo Melinda

Grand Tour general classification results timeline

References

External links
 
 
 
 
 
 Fondriest bicycles

1965 births
Living people
People from Cles
Italian male cyclists
Italian cycle designers
UCI Road World Champions (elite men)
Olympic cyclists of Italy
Cyclists at the 1996 Summer Olympics
Italian Giro d'Italia stage winners
Tour de Suisse stage winners
Sportspeople from Trentino
UCI Road World Cup winners
Cyclists from Trentino-Alto Adige/Südtirol
20th-century Italian people
21st-century Italian people